Parmele is a town in Martin County, North Carolina, United States. The population was 278 at the 2010 census.

History
The town was settled in 1890 when the Wilmington and Weldon Railroad was built through the area to provide transportation from nearby lumber mills. It was named for local lumber mill owner E. A. Parmele. Following the construction of the Albemarle and Raleigh Railroad, the population rapidly grew and it was incorporated as a town in 1893 by the North Carolina General Assembly. A fire that burned through much of the town on April 1, 1904 destroying many businesses and led to the decline of nearby lumber mills. In 1909, William C. Chance founded the Higgs Industrial School for African Americans (also known as the Parmele Industrial Institute) which at its peak occupied a six-building campus and merged with the town's public school. The school was closed following a fire at its main building in 1954.

Geography
Parmele is located at  (35.817123, -77.312220).

Demographics

As of the census of 2000, there were 290 people, 114 households, and 73 families residing. The population density was 244.7 people per square mile (94.1/km2). There were 133 housing units at an average density of 112.2 per square mile (43.2/km2). The racial makeup was 10.69% White, 85.86% African American, 0.34% Native American, 0.34% Asian, and 2.76% from two or more races. Hispanic or Latino of any race were 0.69% of the population.

There were 114 households, out of which 26.3% had children under the age of 18 living with them, 33.3% were married couples living together, 25.4% had a female householder with no husband present, and 35.1% were non-families. 34.2% of all households were made up of individuals, and 21.9% had someone living alone who was 65 years of age or older. The average household size was 2.54 and the average family size was 3.27.

The population was spread out, with 25.5% under the age of 18, 8.6% from 18 to 24, 20.3% from 25 to 44, 27.9% from 45 to 64, and 17.6% who were 65 years of age or older. The median age was 42 years. For every 100 females there were 77.9 males. For every 100 females age 18 and over, there were 78.5 males.

The median income for a household was $20,179, and the median income for a family was $21,528. Males had a median income of $22,344 versus $16,964 for females. The per capita income was $16,976. About 28.0% of families and 29.1% of the population were below the poverty line, including 32.0% of those under the age of eighteen and 28.0% of those 65 or over.

Notable people
Country music group, Parmalee best known for their single "Carolina" is from Parmele.

Author Eloise Greenfield. Greenfield wrote children's books, poetry and a biography of her family.

References

Towns in Martin County, North Carolina
1893 establishments in North Carolina